Cameron Buchanan (31 July 1928 – 10 September 2008) was a Scottish professional footballer.

Buchanan became the youngest player to ever appear for Wolverhampton Wanderers when he played in a wartime fixture against rivals West Bromwich Albion in September 1942, aged 14 years 57 days. He played 18 wartime games in total.

He remained with the club as the Football League resumed after World War II in 1946 but never appeared in an official game for the club. He moved to Bournemouth in 1949, and over five seasons scored 18 goals in 83 games. He had a brief spell with Canadian side Montreal Ukrainia before returning to the UK with Norwich City.

He died on 10 September 2008, aged 80. He had been suffering from dementia.

References

1928 births
2008 deaths
Scottish footballers
Wolverhampton Wanderers F.C. players
AFC Bournemouth players
Norwich City F.C. players
English Football League players
Association football inside forwards